Fuyuan North railway station is a railway station of Hangchangkun Passenger Railway located in Fuyuan County, Qujing, Yunnan, People's Republic of China.

Railway stations in Yunnan
Railway stations in China opened in 2016
Transport in Qujing